Quasar Framework (commonly referred to as Quasar; pronounced ) is an open-source Vue.js based framework for building apps, with a single codebase, and deploy it on the Web as a SPA, PWA, SSR, to a Mobile App, using Cordova for iOS & Android, and to a Desktop App, using Electron for Mac, Windows, and Linux.

Quasar Framework was created by Razvan Stoenescu and is maintained by him and the rest of the active core team members, who work at various companies such as Lenovo, IntelliView Technologies Inc. and AG Development Services.

Overview 
Quasar Framework Quasar’s motto is: Build high-performance VueJS user interfaces in record time. This is possible because you only need to write one authoritative source of code for all platforms: responsive desktop/mobile websites (SPA, SSR + SPA client takeover, SSR + PWA client takeover), PWAs (Progressive Web Apps), mobile apps (that look native) and multi-platform desktop apps (through Electron) and also Browser Extensions.

There’s a component for almost every web development need within Quasar. Quasar is designed with performance & responsiveness in mind, therefore overhead of using Quasar is barely noticeable.

History 
Quasar Framework was created by Razvan Stoenescu after working for IBM and Lenovo using constantly new and different software tools to create all the separate types of iOS apps, Android apps, web apps, websites, Windows Desktop apps, Apple Desktop apps, and PWAs. He later summed up his thought process: "I longed for a single framework that would remove all the complexity and produce all these different flavours of apps … from a SINGLE codebase.
Unable to locate such a mythical tool, I decided to build it."

The first source code commit to the project was dated 2015, and Quasar stable 1.0 release was released in July 2019. The first Quasar conference took place in July 2020. Quasar v2 (with Vue.js 3) went stable in 2.0.0 release in June 2021.

Features

Components 
Quasar apps are built using Vue and *.vue Single File Component system, which contain multiple sections: template (HTML), script (Javascript) and style (CSS/Stylus/SASS/SCSS/Less) - all in the same file.
The code snippet below contains an example of a Quasar component. The component links properties in a side drawer:
<template>
  <q-item
    clickable
    tag="a"
    target="_blank"
    :href="link"
  >
    <q-item-section
      v-if="icon"
      avatar
    >
      <q-icon :name="icon" />
    </q-item-section>

    <q-item-section>
      <q-item-label>{ title }</q-item-label>
      <q-item-label caption>
        {{ caption }}
      </q-item-label>
    </q-item-section>
  </q-item>
</template>

<script>
export default {
  name: 'EssentialLink',
  props: {
    title: {
      type: String,
      required: true
    },

    caption: {
      type: String,
      default: ''
    },

    link: {
      type: String,
      default: '#'
    },

    icon: {
      type: String,
      default: ''
    }
  }
}
</script>

Ecosystem 
The core library comes with tools and libraries both developed by the core team and contributors.

Official tooling 
 Quasar CLI The global part of the CLI needed for the creation of the apps via development and a build environment for cross-device/ cross-platform application development and distribution. 
 Quasar App The local part of the CLI, which entails the development and build environments. The CLI allows for extremely fast development via a dev server, which enables you to see your changes happen live. Using the build systems of the CLI, you to take your single project and build it out to the multiple platforms and environments Quasar supports (i.e. Web, PWA, Web+SSR, PWA+SSR, Cordova, Capacitor, Electron, Browser Extensions, etc.). 
 Quasar UI The component library within Quasar, with battle tested, high performance components along with numerous directives, helper utilities, plugins and more.

See also 

 Comparison of JavaScript frameworks
 JavaScript framework
 JavaScript library
 List of rich web application frameworks
 Multiple phone web-based application framework

Sources

References

External links 
 



Computer-related introductions in 2015
JavaScript web frameworks
Software frameworks
Frameworks
Web development
Software using the MIT license
Communication software
Rich web application frameworks